Sharifabad Rural District is a rural district (dehestan) in Mohammadiyeh District, Alborz County, Qazvin Province, Iran. At the 2006 census, its population was 16,988, in 4,367 families.  The rural district has 3 villages.

References 

Rural Districts of Qazvin Province
Alborz County